During the 1994–95 Italian football season, Calcio Padova competed in the Serie A and their first season in the top flight since the 1961–62 season.

Kit
Padova's kit was manufactured by Italian sports retailer Lotto and sponsored by Acqua Vera.

Squad

Goalkeepers
  Adriano Bonaiuti
  Ennio Dal Bianco

Defenders
  David Balleri
  Andrea Cuicchi
  Franco Gabrielli
  Alexi Lalas
  Massimiliano Rosa
  Cristian Servidei
  Gianluca Zattarin

Midfielders
  Gianni Cavezzi
  Maurizio Coppola
  Gaetano Fontana
  Marco Franceschetti
  Michel Kreek
  Damiano Longhi
  Carmine Nunziata
  Emanuele Pellizzaro
  Carlo Perrone
  Davide Tentoni
  Daniele Zoratto

Attackers
  Giuseppe Galderisi
  Alberto Gallo
  Filippo Maniero
  Roberto Putelli
  Goran Vlaovic

Competitions

Serie A

League table

Matches

References

Padova
Calcio Padova seasons